Xerotus is a genus of fungi in the family Polyporaceae.

Species
Xerotus afer
Xerotus atropurpureus
Xerotus atrovirens
Xerotus berteroi
Xerotus changensis
Xerotus cinnamomeus
Xerotus echinosporus
Xerotus fuliginosus
Xerotus javanicus
Xerotus luteolus
Xerotus madagascariensis
Xerotus martinicensis
Xerotus philippensis
Xerotus poilanei
Xerotus porteri
Xerotus virgineus

External links

Polyporaceae
Polyporales genera
Fungi described in 1828
Taxa named by Elias Magnus Fries